Kinwaqucha (Quechua for "quinoa lake") may refer to:

 Kinwaqucha (Ancash), a lake in the Ancash Region, Peru
 Kinwaqucha (Ayacucho), a lake in the Ayacucho Region, Peru
 Kinwaqucha (Huánuco), a lake at a mountain of that name in the Huánuco Region, Peru